Armatophallus crudescens is a moth of the family Gelechiidae. It is found in Tanzania, Kenya and Yemen.

The wingspan is 13.2–17.1 mm. The forewings are light brown, with the costal margin black and a big spot at three-fourths the length, as well as a diffuse black pattern of irregular shape near the base and two black dots in the middle of the wing. A small black dot is found in the corner of the cell, and a whitish diffuse spot at three-fourths on the costal margin. The hindwings are grey. Adults have been recorded on wing from late November to early December.

References

Moths described in 1920
Armatophallus
Taxa named by Edward Meyrick